Johan Erik Lindh (11 October 1793 – 21 January 1865) was a Swedish painter and a former decorative painter who moved to Finland.

Biography

Lindh was born in Roslagen, the son of a soldier, Erik Lindh, and his wife Maja Greta Lindh. He married Hedvig Kristina Liljeberg. He studied at the Royal Swedish Academy of Arts in Stockholm. He graduated in 1814 and worked as a painter's apprentice. He moved in 1817 to Kokkola and adorned the Vaasa Court of Appeal with paintings. In 1827, Granberg moved from Turku to Helsinki. During the 1830s he was one of the few artists that could support himself with his work.

His works were exhibited for the first time in 1847. Some of his works can be found at the Nationalmuseum, the Helsinki City Art Museum, and the Turku Historical Museum. He painted church altarpieces in Kokkola, Oravais, and Tenala. He also painted a number of portraits. He died in Helsinki.

Gallery

References

 Johan Erik Lindh, from the Nordisk familjebok (1912)

1793 births
1865 deaths
Swedish male painters
18th-century Finnish painters
18th-century male artists
Finnish male painters
19th-century Finnish painters
18th-century Swedish painters
18th-century Swedish male artists
19th-century Swedish painters
Swedish emigrants to Finland
19th-century Swedish male artists
19th-century Finnish male artists